The Chinese Ambassador to Israel is the official representative of the People's Republic of China to the State of Israel.

List of representatives

See also
China–Israel relations

References 

 
Israel
China